Nicolaes Visscher II (1649, Amsterdam – 1702, Amsterdam) was a Dutch engraver, cartographer and publisher. He was the son of Nicolaes Visscher I and the grandson of Claes Janszoon Visscher. After his death, his wife, Elisabeth, continued the family tradition of mapmaking and publishing. The works, engraved plates, were then sold to Peter Schenk, who also reprinted them.

Works

References

External links

1649 births
1702 deaths
Engravers from Amsterdam
Dutch Golden Age printmakers
17th-century Dutch cartographers